Patricia Dahlquist is a Canadian singer and actress. During her music career, Dahlquist released two studio albums and won the Juno Award for Most Promising Female Vocalist of the Year in 1976. After her final album in 1982, Dahlquist opened up a non-profit opera organization in British Columbia and was awarded the Surrey Civic Treasure Award in 2013. As an actress, Dahlquist was in Blackwoods, The Hamster Cage and various TV movies.

Early life and education
Dahlquist was born in Nelson, British Columbia. She attended the University of British Columbia to complete a master's degree in theatre. Additional studies Dahlquist completed were in violin and ballet.

Career
Dahlquist started working in music during the 1970s. After touring with Hagood Hardy, she released her first album This is Patricia Dahlquist in 1975 and her final self-titled album in 1982. During her music career, "Keep Our Love Alive" reached #20 on the RPM Top Singles in 1975 and #157 on the year-end RPM singles chart. The following year, This is Patricia Dahlquist peaked at #88 on the RPM Top 100. On the RPM middle of the road chart, "I Just Wanna Keep It Together" reached #16 in 1977. After her second album, Dahlquist became a voice coach. 

Apart from singing, Dahlquist started a non-profit opera organization for British Columbian youth in 2006. Her first opera The King Who Wouldn't Sing debuted that year and the following opera Spirit Moon was released in 2007. Outside of music, Dahlquist began her acting career starring in the 1962 movie The Street. After featuring in TV movies from the 1980s to 2000s, Dahlquist also appeared in Blackwoods and The Hamster Cage. During her time as an actress, Dahlquist was a theatre teacher and director. Upon completing a five-year stint in Menopositive, The Musical from 1999 to 2004, Dahlquist moved on to focus on her teaching career.

Dahlquist won the 1976 Juno Award for Most Promising Female Vocalist of the Year. In 2013, she was a winner of the Surrey Civic Treasure Award.

Filmography

Film

Television

References

External links
 

Living people
20th-century Canadian actresses
21st-century Canadian actresses
Actresses from British Columbia
Juno Award for Breakthrough Artist of the Year winners
Musicians from British Columbia
People from Nelson, British Columbia
University of British Columbia alumni
Year of birth missing (living people)
20th-century Canadian women singers
21st-century Canadian women singers
Canadian musical theatre actresses